Shreyan Chattopadhyay, born Shreyan Chatterjee, also known by his nickname Dodo, is an Indian composer, singer-songwriter, music producer and musician; who works primarily in Kolkata. His works are noted for integrating traditional orchestral arrangements with electronic music, and rock music. He is the son of film and theatre director Debesh Chattopadhyay, and dancer and actress Kastury Chattopadhyay. In 2017, at the age of 20, Shreyan Chattopadhyay began his career scoring for Pancham Baidik's play "Machi" (Arpita Ghosh's adaptation of Jean-Paul Sartre's The Flies); his debut work on the background score of the play received critical acclaim. Since then, Chattopadhyay has gone on to compose the background score for several theatre productions in Kolkata. His most recent work has been on "Bhopal", a BBC audio documentary series on Rajkumar Keswani and the Bhopal disaster.

Early life
From an early age, Chattopadhyay worked as an actor in his father's Bengali theatre group, Sansriti. In 2010, at the age of 13, he was cast to play the young age of the titular character, in Zee Bangla's small screen adaptation of Sarat Chandra Chattopadhyay's Devdas. His performance as a child actor was commended; and he went on to star alongside Sujan Mukhopadhyay in his father's theatre production, "Break Fail". Since then, he has not revisited acting. Chattopadhyay completed his schooling from Salt Lake School. In school, he was a part of the school band "Chords of Canopy", as a lead guitarist.

His interest shifted from acting to music during his high school years. Chattopadhyay never received any formal music training; and is a self taught guitarist and composer.  In 2015, Chattopadhyay began to pursue an undergraduate course in English, from Jadavpur University. In college, he devoted more time to songwriting than playing the guitar. During this time, he wrote and performed his own songs in various college events.

In 2016, Shreyan Chattopadhyay independently released an alternative rock album, titled "Footprints on the Sea". One of his college friends, Souradeep Sen, provided the vocals for the album; while Chattopadhyay wrote, arranged, recorded, mixed and mastered all of the songs on his own. The entire album was produced in his bedroom studio; which he had put up during his second year of college. This album caught the attention of Arpita Ghosh; which led to his debut work on Pancham Baidik's production, "Machi".

Career
Shreyan Chattopadhyay began his career as a theatre composer in 2017, with Arpita Ghosh's play "Machi". In the same year, he composed the background score for Shyamal Chakraborty's play "Hontarok". In 2018, Shreyan Chattopadhyay worked for the first time in one of his father's plays as a composer. He wrote the musical score for his father's play, "Amodito Roddur"; which was produced under the banner of Pancham Baidik. His work on the play was critically well received. He then went on to score for Rajib Bardhan's Bengali adaptation of Henrik Ibsen's When We Dead Awaken; the play was titled "Jaganiya Mritajan". Chattopadhyay wrote and produced an entirely electronic score, for his father's first production under the banner of Swapnasandhani. His original score for "1984?" (Debesh Chattopadhyay's adaptation of George Orwell's dystopian novel Nineteen Eighty-Four) also featured two guest voice-overs; from Debshankar Haldar and Arpita Ghosh respectively. His "raucous soundtrack" for the play received critical acclaim. In 2020, Shreyan composed the background score for "Sher Afgan" (Debesh Chattopadhyay's adaptation of Luigi Pirandello's play Henry IV (Pirandello). In 2022, he worked on music and sound design for Neil McCarthy's (producer of Death in Ice Valley) audio documentary series "Bhopal" (from BBC Radio 4) based on the Indian journalist Rajkumar Keswani and the Bhopal disaster.

See also
Debesh Chattopadhyay
Arpita Ghosh
Suman Mukhopadhyay
Kaushik Sen
Bratya Basu

References

Living people
1997 births
People from Kolkata
Jadavpur University alumni
Indian film score composers
21st-century Indian composers
Indian sound designers
Indian musical theatre composers
Musicians from West Bengal
Singers from West Bengal
Bengali film score composers
Musicians from Kolkata
Singers from Kolkata
Bengali theatre personalities
Indian male film score composers
21st-century Indian male singers
21st-century Indian singers
Bengali Hindus